John Cooper (born October 15, 1956) is an American businessman who is the mayor of Nashville, Tennessee. A Democrat, he served as a councilman at-large on the Metropolitan Council of Nashville and Davidson County from 2015 until 2019. He is the brother of former U.S. Representative Jim Cooper, who represented Tennessee's 5th congressional district, which was based in Nashville.

Education and early career 
Cooper was born in Nashville and raised in Shelbyville, Tennessee. Cooper earned his bachelor's degree from Harvard University, and his Master of Business Administration from Vanderbilt University in 1985. He worked in finance for Shearson Lehman Brothers on Wall Street, before returning to Nashville to work in real estate development in Williamson County, Tennessee.

Political career 
In 1980, Cooper worked on the congressional campaign of Buddy Roemer and the campaign of Jane Eskind for the Tennessee Public Service Commission. Roemer hired Cooper, then 23 years old, as his chief of staff.

Cooper ran for an at-large seat on the Metropolitan Council of Nashville and Davidson County in 2015. He was elected, receiving the most votes of the candidates running for the five available at-large seats.

Cooper ran for mayor of Nashville in the 2019 Nashville mayoral election. In the election's first round, Cooper led all candidates with 35% of the vote, advancing to a runoff election against David Briley, who received 25%, as both were ahead of Vanderbilt University professor Carol M. Swain and Tennessee House of Representatives member John Ray Clemmons in the 10-candidate race. Cooper defeated Briley in the runoff election, receiving 69% of the vote. He is the first candidate to defeat an incumbent mayor of Nashville in an election since its consolidation in 1963. Cooper’s campaign financing included $1.4 million in personal loans.  Cooper raised less money for his campaign than his opponent but outspent Briley using his own money.  Cooper was sworn into office on September 28.

On January 31, 2023, Cooper announced that he would not run for reelection in the 2023 Nashville mayoral election.

Political positions

Sanctuary city status
Cooper has stated that "Nashville cannot and will not be a sanctuary city." In October 2019, Cooper reversed an executive order implemented by former mayor David Briley in his last few weeks in office that reportedly discouraged local cooperation with federal immigration authorities and encouraged the repeal of state laws described as "anti-sanctuary" laws.

Personal life 
Cooper's wife, Laura Fitzgerald Cooper, is a former constitutional law professor. They have three sons. Cooper's father, Prentice Cooper, was the 39th governor of Tennessee. John's brother Jim was the U.S. representative for Tennessee's 5th congressional district, which prior to redistricting, encompassed Nashville and two surrounding counties.

See also
 List of mayors of the 50 largest cities in the United States

References

External links

 

1956 births
Businesspeople from Tennessee
Cooper family
Harvard College alumni
Heads of county government in Tennessee
Living people
Mayors of Nashville, Tennessee
Metropolitan Council members (Nashville, Tennessee)
People from Shelbyville, Tennessee
Political chiefs of staff
Tennessee Democrats
United States congressional aides
Vanderbilt University alumni
21st-century American politicians